The 145th Street station was an express station on the demolished IRT Ninth Avenue Line in Manhattan, New York City. It had 2 levels. The lower level was built first and had 2 tracks and 2 side platforms and served local trains. The upper level was built as part of the Dual Contracts and had 1 track and 2 side platforms over the local tracks that served express trains. The station opened on December 1, 1879 and closed on June 11, 1940. The next southbound local stop was 140th Street. The next southbound express stop was 125th Street. The next northbound local stop was 151st Street. The next northbound express stop was 155th Street.

References

IRT Ninth Avenue Line stations
Railway stations in the United States opened in 1879
Railway stations closed in 1940
Former elevated and subway stations in Manhattan
1879 establishments in New York (state)
1940 disestablishments in New York (state)